Apostolos Angelis is a Greek composer, engineer and producer of Εlectronic, Classical and Orchestral music.

Apostolos Angelis is from Trikala Thessaly, Greece, a self-taught musician who has learned composing music in his mind without keeping notes. During the years, Apostolos has collaborated with respected musicians in London (where he currently lives) and also worked as engineer and producer on various other projects.

Discography

Studio albums 
 Hologram (2009)
 Prophecy Of Heavens (2012)
 The Mad And The Genius (2013)
 Kinesis (2014)
 Coloring Of Life (2017)
 Mythocosmos (2022)

References

External links 
 Official website

Greek composers
1983 births
Living people
People from Trikala